Saale-Rennsteig is a former Verwaltungsgemeinschaft ("collective municipality") in the district Saale-Orla-Kreis, in Thuringia, Germany. The seat of the Verwaltungsgemeinschaft was in Blankenstein. It was disbanded in January 2019.

The Verwaltungsgemeinschaft Saale-Rennsteig consisted of the following municipalities:
Birkenhügel 
Blankenberg 
Blankenstein 
Harra
Neundorf bei Lobenstein 
Pottiga 
Schlegel

References

Former Verwaltungsgemeinschaften in Thuringia